The 2022 IBSF European Championships were held from 14 to 16 January 2022 in St. Moritz, Switzerland.

Medal summary

Medal table

Bobsleigh

Skeleton

References

European Championships
European Championships
2022 in Swiss sport
International sports competitions hosted by Switzerland
Skeleton in Switzerland
Bobsleigh in Switzerland
Bobsleigh competitions
Skeleton competitions
January 2022 sports events in Switzerland